The Maguindanao kulintang ensemble is a musical ensemble in the kulintang tradition of the Maranao and the Maguindanao. Other forms of the kulintang ensembles are played in parts of Southeast Asia especially in the eastern parts of Maritime Southeast Asia — the Southern Philippines, Eastern Indonesia, Eastern Malaysia, Brunei and Timor. There are mainly five instruments on the ensemble: Kulintang, Agung, Gandingan, Babendil and Dabakan.

References 

Culture of Maguindanao del Norte
Culture of Maguindanao del Sur
Kulintang